You may also be looking for Mapleton community in Moncton

 Mapleton is a Canadian rural community in Kings County, New Brunswick.  Mapleton is on Route 895.

History

Notable people

See also
List of communities in New Brunswick

References

Communities in Kings County, New Brunswick